Gaucho is the seventh studio album by the American rock band Steely Dan, released on November 21, 1980, by MCA Records. The sessions for Gaucho represent the band's typical penchant for studio perfectionism and obsessive recording technique. To record the album, the band used at least 42 different musicians, spent over a year in the studio, and far exceeded the original monetary advance given by the record label. In 1981, the album won the Grammy Award for Best Engineered Non-Classical Recording and received Grammy nominations for Album of the Year and Best Pop Performance by a Duo or Group with Vocals.

During the two-year span in which the album was recorded, the band was plagued by a number of creative, personal and professional problems. MCA, Warner Bros. and Steely Dan had a three-way legal battle over the rights to release the album. After it was released, jazz musician Keith Jarrett was given a co-writing credit on the title track after threatening legal action over plagiarism of Jarrett's song "'Long As You Know You're Living Yours". 
Gaucho marked a significant stylistic change for the band, introducing a more minimal, groove and atmosphere-based format. The harmonically complex chord changes that were a distinctive mark of earlier Steely Dan songs are less prominent on Gaucho, with the record's songs tending to revolve around a single rhythm or mood, although complex chord progressions were still present particularly in "Babylon Sisters" and "Glamour Profession". Gaucho proved to be Steely Dan's final studio album before a 20-year hiatus from the recording industry.

Background
Exceptional difficulties plagued the album's production. By 1978, Donald Fagen and Walter Becker had established themselves as the only two permanent members of Steely Dan, using a revolving cast of session musicians to record the songs they wrote together. However, the pair's working relationship began to strain, largely because of Becker's increasing drug use.

During the course of the Gaucho sessions, Becker was hit by a car late one Saturday night while walking home to his apartment on the Upper West Side. Becker managed to push the woman he was with out of harm's way, but sustained multiple fractures in one leg, a sprain in the other leg, and other injuries. During his six-month recovery, he suffered from secondary infections. While Becker was in the hospital, he and Fagen continued their musical collaborations via telephone.

Becker's personal problems continued to mount when his girlfriend, Karen Roberta Stanley, died of a drug overdose at his home on January 30, 1980. Her family sued him for $17.5 million in January 1981, claiming that he had introduced the woman to cocaine, morphine, barbiturates, and heroin. The court later ruled in Becker's favor.

Music and lyrics
According to Stylus Magazines Mike Powell, Gaucho combines "bitter, poetic cynicism with freewheeling jazz-rock", while Stephen Thomas Erlewine from AllMusic says it "essentially replicates the smooth jazz-pop of Aja, but with none of that record's dark, seductive romance or elegant aura". Similarly, rock historian Joe Stuessy suggests it is one in a series of Steely Dan albums that showed a progression of jazz influences in the band's sound, which was often described as "jazz-rock fusion". Music journalist and broadcaster Paul Sexton writes that, while Aja had "announced their ever-greater exploration of jazz influences", Gaucho is "their yacht rock masterpiece". In connection with the latter genre, Timothy Malcolm from Houstonia magazine says the album features "a number of yachty delights", while Erlewine highlights the title track as exemplary of the genre. Patrick Hosken from MTV News says that, like Aja, Gaucho shows how "great yacht rock is also more musically ambitious than it might seem, tying blue-eyed soul and jazz to funk and R&B".

Hal Leonard's Best of Steely Dan explains that Gaucho is "a concept album of seven interrelated tales about would-be hipsters." The lyrics of "Hey Nineteen" are about an aging hipster attempting to pick up a girl who is so young that she does not recognize "'Retha Franklin" playing on the stereo. The song closes with the ambiguous line, "The Cuervo Gold, the fine Colombian, make tonight a wonderful thing", leaving it up to the listener whether the narrator is consuming tequila and drugs with the love interest, or if he is in fact alone.

Stewart Mason of AllMusic says that "Time Out of Mind" is "a barely veiled song about heroin, specifically a young man's first experience with the drug at the hands of a pretentious, pseudo-religious crank talking of 'chasing the dragon' with the 'mystical sphere direct from Lhasa.'" According to Ian MacDonald, "Two songs are about hookers, two more concern the doings of coke dealers, and a fifth depicts the denouement of a seedy marital dispute. What redeems it all is the humour and artistry. Lyrics exude class as well as underclass, while the music, whatever its guise or disguise, is immaculate".

Record World said that "Time Out of Mind" "offers an aural array
of rich keyboard/guitar figures."

Keith Jarrett sued Becker and Fagen for copyright infringement over the title track of the album, claiming it plagiarized "'Long As You Know You're Living Yours" from his 1974 album Belonging. As a result, Jarrett has since been included as a co-author of the track. In an interview after Gaucho was released, Fagen said that he loved the Jarrett track and had been strongly influenced by it.

Recording

Recording sessions
With 1977's Aja, the duo had become accustomed to recording with (largely) Los Angeles-based session musicians. Sessions for Gaucho began in New York City during 1978. The transition to using New York City players during the Gaucho sessions proved difficult, because the musicians were unenthusiastic about Becker and Fagen's obsessive, perfectionist recording style.

Fagen and Becker hired Mark Knopfler to play the guitar solo on "Time Out of Mind" after hearing him play on Dire Straits' hit single "Sultans of Swing". Several hours of Knopfler's playing were recorded at the session, but his contributions as heard on the record are limited to around forty seconds.

The album's mixing sessions proved to be just as difficult as the recording sessions. It took Becker, Fagen, Nichols and Katz more than 55 attempts to complete a satisfactory mix of the 50-second fade-out of "Babylon Sisters".

Drum recording

Even though the session players hired for Gaucho were amongst the most talented from both the East and West Coast session fraternities, Fagen and Becker were still not satisfied with the basic tracks for some of the songs, particularly with regard to the timing of the drum tracks. In a 2006 interview for Sound On Sound Magazine, Donald Fagen stated that he and Becker told recording engineer Roger Nichols:

"'It's too bad that we can't get a machine to play the beat we want, with full-frequency drum sounds, and to be able to move the snare drum and kick drum around independently.' Nichols replied 'I can do that.' This was back in 1978 or something, so we said 'You can do that???' To which he said 'Yes, all I need is $150,000.' So we gave him the money out of our recording budget, and six weeks later he came in with this machine and that is how it all started."

Nichols named the drum machine "Wendel". Subsequently, Wendel was awarded a platinum record.

According to Ken Micallef in an article in Modern Drummer, the title song's drum track was assembled from 46 different takes. The drummer on the session, Jeff Porcaro, is quoted as saying:

"From noon till six we'd play the tune over and over and over again, nailing each part. We'd go to dinner and come back and start recording. They made everybody play like their life depended on it. But they weren't gonna keep anything anyone else played that night, no matter how tight it was. All they were going for was the drum track."

Drummer Bernard Purdie plays his signature half-time shuffle beat, the Purdie Shuffle, on "Babylon Sisters".

"The Second Arrangement", outtakes and bootlegs
"The Second Arrangement" had been a favorite of producer Gary Katz and Nichols. In late December 1979, after weeks of working on a particular recording of the track, approximately three-quarters of the song was accidentally erased by an assistant engineer who had been asked by Katz to ready the track for listening. The band attempted to re-record the track, but eventually abandoned the song entirely.

Steely Dan biographer Brian Sweet has written that the group abandoned the song in favor of focusing on "Third World Man". "The Second Arrangement" was never played live by Steely Dan until a rarities show on September 17, 2011, and a studio recording of the song remains unreleased. However, a handful of demo and outtake recordings of the song exist in bootleg form.

In addition to "The Second Arrangement", a number of songs were written for the album which were not included in the final release. Some of them were included on a bootleg titled The Lost Gaucho, which features recordings from early in the sessions for the album. Song titles include "Kind Spirit", "Kulee Baba", "The Bear" and "Talkin' About My Home", as well as "The Second Arrangement". An early version of "Third World Man", with alternate lyrics, is included under the title "Were You Blind That Day". That recording dates from the Aja sessions.

In 2020, Cimchie Nichols, the daughter of engineer Roger Nichols, said that the family had discovered three cassettes that may include working mixdowns of "The Second Arrangement."

During a guitar clinic in 2011, Larry Carlton said of "Third World Man": "When Billboard magazine came out ... about Gaucho, it's writing about the news 'Steely Dan released ... bla bla bla ... and great guitar solo by Larry Carlton', and I said, 'but I didn't play on Gaucho!, they'd cut it in New York, I didn't play on it!'. So I found out later: they had finished mixing in New York, and one of the second engineers erased one of their master tracks. So "Third World Man" was in the can from The Royal Scam and they had to reach back into the old tapes and find something to finish the album, and that's how I ended up on Gaucho playing "Third World Man".

Artwork
The cover art is based upon a wall plaque entitled "Guardia Vieja – Tango" (Old Guard – Tango) by Argentine artist Israel Hoffmann; which is located in a southside Buenos Aires promenade known as Caminito, in the neighborhood of La Boca.

Release
Just prior to the album's release, the band members had another argument with MCA over the retail list price. MCA made Steely Dan, along with Tom Petty and the Heartbreakers' Hard Promises and the Olivia Newton-John/Electric Light Orchestra Xanadu soundtrack, a test case for its new "superstar pricing" policy, whereby new albums by top-selling artists would sell for $9.98, one dollar more than those of other artists. Steely Dan opposed this idea, fearful that the fans would place blame on them.

Critical reception

The album was greeted with mostly positive reviews. Rolling Stone'''s Ariel Swartley said of the album: "After years of hibernation in the studio, the metamorphosis that began with The Royal Scam is complete. Steely Dan have perfected the aesthetic of the tease." The New York Times gave Gaucho a positive review, later deeming it the best album of 1980, beating out Talking Heads’ Remain in Light and Joy Division's Closer. The album also received a positive review from the Montreal Gazette.

Not all reviews were positive. The second edition of The Rolling Stone Album Guide gave Gaucho a rating of 1 star out of 5; critic Dave Marsh called it "the kind of music that passes for jazz in Holiday Inn lounges, with the kind of lyrics that pass for poetry in freshman English classes." Pete Bishop of The Pittsburgh Press found it "too well-crafted, too artificially sophisticated", and lacking in spontaneity. The Village Voices Robert Christgau remarked, "Even the song with Aretha in it lends credence to rumors that the LP was originally entitled Countdown to Lethargy." In 2000 it was voted number 504 in Colin Larkin's All Time Top 1000 Albums.

In a retrospective review for AllMusic, Stephen Thomas Erlewine wrote that Gaucho, while sonically similar to Aja, features musical performances that have been overly rehearsed to the point of lacking emotional resonance, as well as inferior songwriting, excepting the highlights "Babylon Sisters", "Time Out of Mind" and "Hey Nineteen", which "make the remainder of the album's glossy, meandering fusion worthwhile". David Sakowski of PopMatters reappraised the album as a "classic" that was largely "lost in the shadow of Aja and the changing tides of music".

Keith Jarrett lawsuit
Following the release of Gaucho in 1980, jazz pianist Keith Jarrett sued the band for copyright infringement. Gauchos title track, credited to Donald Fagen and Walter Becker, bore a resemblance to Jarrett's "Long As You Know You're Living Yours" from Jarrett's 1974 album Belonging. In an interview with Musician magazine, Becker and Fagen were asked about the similarity between the two pieces of music, and Becker told Musician that he loved the Jarrett composition while Fagen said they had been influenced by it. After their comments were published, Jarrett sued, and Becker and Fagen were legally obliged to add his name to the credits and provide Jarrett with publishing royalties.

AccoladesGaucho'' won the 1981 Grammy Award for Best Non-Classical Engineered Recording.

Commercial performance
The album reached #9 on the U.S. Album Chart and was certified Platinum. "Hey Nineteen" reached #10 on the U.S. Singles Chart, and went to #1 in Canada. The album reached #27 on the UK Albums Chart.

Track listing
All songs written by Walter Becker and Donald Fagen, except where noted.

Personnel

Steely Dan
 Donald Fagen – lead vocals, backing vocals, synthesizer (2–6), electric piano (2–5), organ (6)
 Walter Becker – bass (2, 4, 5), guitar (2, 5), guitar solo (4)

Additional musicians

 Randy Brecker – trumpet (1, 4, 5), flugelhorn (1, 6)
 Wayne Andre – trombone (6)
 Tom Scott – alto saxophone, clarinet (1); tenor saxophone (1, 3, 4, 6); Lyricon (3, 6), horn arrangement (3, 4, 6)
 David Sanborn – alto saxophone (5)
 Michael Brecker – tenor saxophone (3, 5, 6)
 Dave Tofani – tenor saxophone (5)
 Ronnie Cuber – baritone saxophone (5)
 Walter Kane – clarinet (1)
 George Marge – clarinet
 Rob Mounsey – piano (3–5), synthesizer (7), horn arrangement (1, 5)
 Don Grolnick – electric piano, Clavinet (1)
 Pat Rebillot – electric piano (6)
 Joe Sample – electric piano (7)
 Hiram Bullock – guitar (6)
 Larry Carlton – lead guitar (7)
 Rick Derringer – guitar (6)
 Steve Khan – guitar (1, 3, 4, 7), lead guitar (6)
 Mark Knopfler – lead guitar (5)
 Hugh McCracken – guitars (2, 5)
 Chuck Rainey – bass (1, 7)
 Steve Gadd – drums (3, 6, 7), percussion (2)
 Anthony Jackson – bass (3, 6)
 Rick Marotta – drums (2, 5)
 Jeff Porcaro – drums (4)
 Bernard Purdie – drums (1)
 Errol "Crusher" Bennett – percussion (1, 4)
 Victor Feldman – percussion (2)
 Ralph MacDonald – percussion (3, 6)
 Nicholas Marrero – percussion (6)
 Michael McDonald (5), Patti Austin (1, 4, 5), Valerie Simpson (3–6), Frank Floyd (2, 3, 6), Diva Gray (1), Gordon Grody (1), Lani Groves (1), Lesley Miller (1, 3–5), Zachary Sanders (2, 3, 6), Toni Wine (1) – backing vocals

Production

 Producer: Gary Katz
 Executive producers: Paul Bishow, Roger Nichols
 Executive engineer: Roger Nichols
 Assistant engineers: John "Doc" Daugherty, Gerry Gabinelli, Craig Goetsch, Tom Greto, Barbara Isaak, Georgia Offrell, John Potoker, Linda Randazzo, Marti Robertson, Carla Bandini
 Production coordination: Jeff Fura, Margaret Goldfarb, Shannon Steckloff
 Mixing: Elliot Scheiner
 Coordination: Michael Etchart
 Sequencing: Roger Nichols, Wendel
 Recording: Elliot Scheiner, Bill Schnee
 Mastering: Bob Ludwig
 Overdubs: Jerry Garszva, Roger Nichols
 Surround mix: Elliot Scheiner
 Rhythm arrangements: Paul Griffin, Don Grolnick, Rob Mounsey, Steely Dan
 Horn arrangements: Rob Mounsey, Tom Scott
 Piano technician: Don Farrar
 Special effects: Roger Nichols, Wendel
 Consultant: Daniel Levitin
 Art direction: Vartan, Suzanne Walsh
 Design: Michael Diehl, Suzanne Walsh
 Design assistant: John Tom Cohoe
 Photography: Rene Burri
 Photo research: Ryan Null
 Liner notes: Walter Becker, Donald Fagen, Frank Kafka (actually Franz Kafka)
 Liner note translation: Victor Di Suvero

Charts

Weekly charts

Year-end charts

Certifications

References

External links
 Complete lyrics
 

1980 albums
Steely Dan albums
Albums produced by Gary Katz
MCA Records albums
Grammy Award for Best Engineered Album, Non-Classical